Hossein Amir-Abdollahian (born 1964) is an Iranian politician, diplomat and current foreign minister of Iran. He was formerly the deputy foreign minister for Arab and African Affairs from 2011 to 2016.

He was special aide to the speaker of the Iranian Parliament on international affairs, Director General of International Affairs of the Islamic Consultative Assembly from the presidency of Ali Larijani to the presidency of Mohammad Bagher Ghalibaf, Secretary-General of the Permanent Secretariat of the International Conference in Support of the Palestinian Intifada, Managing Director of Palestine Strategic Dialogue Quarterly.

He is a well-known figure in the State Department, and his outspoken and active international and regional stance has highlighted him in the crises of Iraq, Syria, and developments in West Asia and North Africa. He holds a Ph.D. from Tehran University in international relations.

He was appointed Deputy Foreign Minister during the ministry of Ali Akbar Salehi, which was retained in the first three years of Mohammad Javad Zarif's ministry. He is currently professor at the State Department's School of International Relations.

After the implicit resignation of Zarif, the name of Amirabdollahian was mentioned by some media outlets as one of the candidates for the post of minister, who was close to Ali Larijani, the speaker of the then Iranian parliament.

Early life and education 
Amirabdollahian was born in 1964 in Damghan. At the age of 6-7, he lost his father. He was married in 1994 and has a son and a daughter. He holds a Ph.D. from Tehran University in international relations and is said to be fluent in Arabic and English, even though he can not communicate well in English.

Affiliation 
Amirabdullahian's positions are more reflective of Seyyed Ali Khamenei and do not fit in clearly within either reformists or fundamentalist trends in the Iranian political discourse. Some of his stances are in a way that supports the so-called Resistance Front, which is affiliated with Hezbollah in Lebanon, Syria, and other currents aligned with the Islamic Republic of Iran that are in conflict with Israel.

He was a member of the Political and Security Committee of the Nuclear Negotiations during the nuclear talks during the presidency of Seyyed Mohammad Khatami. He is the first Iranian official to be invited to London for regional talks after the reopening of the London embassy in Tehran during Hassan Rouhani's first term, and to meet with then-British Foreign Secretary Philip Hammond. He has detailed regional talks with Federica Mogherini on his file, and has had detailed meetings with UN Secretary-General Ban Ki-moon and Hezbollah-Lebanon Secretary-General Seyed Hassan Nasrallah.

Negotiation with the United States 
He was the head of the Iranian negotiating team at the Iran-Iraq-US trilateral meeting in Baghdad in 2007. The meeting was held to secure Iraq at the request of the Americans, who called the situation in Iraq dangerous. The talks failed after three sessions without result. Amirabdollahian later said of the talks that the Americans left the scene when they heard a logical word and did not have a logical answer. At the beginning of the US negotiations, they thought that they should set the agenda, but the Islamic Republic did not allow them to do so, and it was decided that the agenda should be set by agreement of the parties.

Communication with Qasem Soleimani 
He had a close relationship with Qasem Soleimani, and this was due to two decades of responsibility in the Ministry of Foreign Affairs, especially in the Arab and African positions of the Ministry of Foreign Affairs of Iran. When Soleimani became commander of the Quds Force, Amirabdollahian was an Iraqi expert at the Foreign Ministry. During the US invasion of Iraq in 2003, with the overthrow of Saddam, he became in charge of Iraq at the State Department.

Amirabdollahian later during a meeting with European delegations and officials said that you should thank the Islamic Republic and Soleimani because Soleimani has contributed to world peace and security. He believes that without Soleimani, the major countries in the region would have disintegrated.

Career 

 The former Deputy Foreign Minister for Arab and African Affairs
Special aide to the speaker of the Iranian Parliament on international affairs
Director General of International Affairs of the Islamic Consultative Assembly
Secretary-General of the Permanent Secretariat of the International Conference in Support of the Palestinian Intifada
Managing Director of Palestine Strategic Dialogue Quarterly
Ambassador of the Islamic Republic of Iran in Bahrain
Deputy Director-General of the Persian Gulf Ministry of Foreign Affairs
Member of the founding board of the Center for West Asian Studies
Visiting Professor, Faculty of World Studies, University of Tehran
Visiting Professor, Faculty of International Relations, Ministry of Foreign Affairs

Research works 
Amirabdollahian wrote "Levant's morning" (صبح شام), a narrative of the Syrian crisis. "The inefficiency of the Greater Middle East Plan",(ناکارآمدی طرح خاورمیانه بزرگ), what is the cause of the inefficiency of the Greater Middle East Plan and its relation to the rise of the Islamic Awakening?, "Conflicting US Democracy in the New Iraq" (دموکراسی متعارض ایالات متحده آمریکا در عراق جدید) and "Dual containment" (استراتژی مهار دوگانه) Explain the strategy of containment of Iraq and the Islamic Republic of Iran.

References

External links

1964 births
Living people
People from Semnan Province
Foreign ministers of Iran
Ambassadors of Iran to Bahrain
University of Tehran alumni
20th-century Iranian people
21st-century Iranian diplomats
21st-century Iranian politicians